Younis Khamis Ibrahim (born July 23, 1982 in Dubai) is an Emirati professional basketball player.

Club career
At the club level, Khamis plays for the AlWasl Club AlShabab Club AlAHli Club in the UAE basketball league. He is also a member of the United Arab Emirates national basketball team.

International career
Khamis competed for the United Arab Emirates national basketball team at both the FIBA Asia Championship 2007 and GCC Championship 2007 and FIBA Asia Championship 2009 and GCC championship 2010 and FIBA Asia Japan championship 2011 and Arab championship 2011 and Dubai tournaments 2012 and 2013.

References

1982 births
Living people
Emirati men's basketball players
Sportspeople from Dubai
Point guards
Shooting guards